Gurkhar (also Romanized as Gūrkhar and Gūr-e Khār; also known as Kūreh Khvār, Gūr Khvār, Gowhar, and Gūreh Khār) is a village in Bagh-e Keshmir Rural District, Salehabad County, Razavi Khorasan Province, Iran. At the 2006 census, its population was 476, in 105 families.

References 

Populated places in   Torbat-e Jam County